This is a list of notable events in country music that took place in the year 1983.

Events
 March — In a span of two days, two major cable networks signed on the air. Country Music Television (CMT) went on-the-air March 5, while The Nashville Network (TNN) came on two days later on March 7. CMT  (originally called "CMTV") was chiefly video-oriented, while TNN offered more feature-oriented programming.

Top hits of the year

Singles released by American artists

Singles released by Canadian artists

Top new album releases

Other top albums
{| class="wikitable sortable"
|-
! US
! Album
! Artist
! Record Label
|-
| align="center"| 34
| After All This Time
| Mel Tillis
| MCA
|-
| align="center"| 61
| All-American Cowboys
| Various Artists
| Kat Family
|-
| align="center"| 41
| All-American Redneck
| Randy Howard
| Warner Bros.
|-
| align="center"| 35
| All Time Heart Touching Favorites
| Roger Whittaker
| Main Street
|-
| align="center"| 61
| Back
| Lynn Anderson
| Permian
|-
| align="center"| 36
| Behind the Scene
| Reba McEntire
| Mercury
|-
| align="center"| 48
| Better Days
| Guy Clark
| Warner Bros.
|-
| align="center"| 61
| Bill Monroe and Friends
| Bill Monroe
| MCA
|-
| align="center"| 57
| Classic Conway
| Conway Twitty
| MCA
|-
| align="center"| 70
| Classic Country
| Albert Coleman's Atlanta Pops
| Epic
|-
| align="center"| 30
| Close Up
| Louise Mandrell
| RCA
|-
| align="center"| 56
| Country Boy's Heart
| Ronnie McDowell
| Epic
|-
| align="center"| 63
| Country Christmas, Volume 2
| Various Artists
| RCA
|-
| align="center"| 36
| Country Classics
| Charley Pride
| RCA
|-
| align="center"| 50
| Dangerous
| Tony Joe White
| Columbia
|-
| align="center"| 35
| Delia Bell
| Delia Bell
| Warner Bros.
|-
| align="center"| 41
| Devoted to Your Memory
| Moe Bandy
| Columbia
|-
| align="center"| 28
| The Epic Collection (Recorded Live)
| Merle Haggard
| Epic
|-
| align="center"| 66
| Even the Strong Get Lonely
| Tammy Wynette
| Epic
|-
| align="center"| 64
| Footprints in the Sand
| Cristy Lane
| LS/Liberty
|-
| align="center"| 30
| For Every Rose
| Johnny Rodriguez
| Epic
|-
| align="center"| 27
| The Great American Dream
| B. J. Thomas
| Cleveland Int'l.
|-
| align="center"| 33
| Greatest Hits
| Razzy Bailey
| RCA
|-
| align="center"| 63
| Greatest Hits
| Lacy J. Dalton
| Columbia
|-
| align="center"| 41
| Greatest Hits
| Johnny Lee
| Warner Bros.
|-
| align="center"| 67
| Greatest Hits
| Ray Stevens
| RCA
|-
| align="center"| 31
| Gus Hardin
| Gus Hardin
| RCA
|-
| align="center"| 42
| Harvest Moon
| Joe Waters
| New Colony
|-
| align="center"| 27
| The Heart Never Lies
| Michael Martin Murphey
| Liberty
|-
| align="center"| 44
| Heart to Heart
| Merle Haggard & Leona Williams
| Mercury
|-
| align="center"| 38
| Hello in There
| David Allan Coe
| Columbia
|-
| align="center"| 35
| I Was the One
| Elvis Presley
| RCA
|-
| align="center"| 55
| It's About Time
| John Denver
| RCA
|-
| align="center"| 65
| The Jim Reeves Medley
| Jim Reeves
| RCA
|-
| align="center"| 27
| Jones Country
| George Jones
| Epic
|-
| align="center"| 34
| Leon Everette
| Leon Everette
| RCA
|-
| align="center"| 61
| Let the Hard Times Roll
| McGuffey Lane
| Atco
|-
| align="center"| 26
| Let's Go
| Nitty Gritty Dirt Band
| Liberty
|-
| align="center"| 36
| A Lifetime of Song 1951–1982
| Marty Robbins
| Columbia
|-
| align="center"| 27
| Lost in the Feeling
| Conway Twitty
| Warner Bros.
|-
| align="center"| 60
| Lyin', Cheatin', Woman Chasin',Honky Tonkin', Whiskey Drinkin' You
| Loretta Lynn
| MCA
|-
| align="center"| 48
| Master of the Art
| Ray Price
| Viva
|-
| align="center"| 36
| Memory Lane
| Joe Stampley
| Epic
|-
| align="center"| 37
| Merry Twismas from Conway Twittyand His Little Friends
| Conway Twitty
| Warner Bros.
|-
| align="center"| 39
| Midnight Fire
| Steve Wariner
| RCA
|-
| align="center"| 62
| ''My Fingers Do the Talkin| Jerry Lee Lewis
| MCA
|-
| align="center"| 49
| The Nashville Sessions
| Dean Martin
| Warner Bros.
|-
| align="center"| 63
| Naturally Country
| Mel McDaniel
| Capitol
|-
| align="center"| 65
| New Horizons
| Dottie West
| Liberty
|-
| align="center"| 35
| ...Not the Man I Used to Be
| Boxcar Willie
| Main Street
|-
| align="center"| 32
| On My Own Again
| David Frizzell
| Viva
|-
| align="center"| 35
| One Particular Harbour
| Jimmy Buffett
| MCA
|-
| align="center"| 32
| Over Easy
| Terri Gibbs
| MCA
|-
| align="center"| 34
| Ready
| Jerry Reed
| RCA
|-
| align="center"| 40
| Rebel Heart
| Dan Seals
| Liberty
|-
| align="center"| 26
| Red Hot
| Shelly West
| Viva
|-
| align="center"| 54
| Those Were the Days
| Gary Stewart & Dean Dillon
| RCA
|-
| align="center"| 30
| Today My World Slipped Away
| Vern Gosdin
| AMI
|-
| align="center"| 26
| Too Hot to Sleep
| Louise Mandrell
| RCA
|-
| align="center"| 48
| Viva Porter Wagoner
| Porter Wagoner
| Warner Bros.
|-
| align="center"| 48
| What Can I Say
| Gail Davies
| Warner Bros.
|-
| align="center"| 29
| Wish You Were Here Tonight
| Ray Charles
| Columbia
|-
| align="center"| 64
| Work It out with Chet Atkins C.G.P.
| Chet Atkins
| Columbia
|-
| align="center"| 35
| You're Not Leavin' Here Tonight
| Ed Bruce
| MCA
|}

On television

Regular series
 Hee Haw (1969–1993, syndicated)
 That Nashville Music (1970–1985, syndicated)

Specials

Births
January 29 — Eric Paslay, singer-songwriter of the 2010s.
March 10 — Carrie Underwood, 2005 American Idol winner, boosting her career.
June 20 — Grace Potter, rock singer who crossed-over to country with duets with Kenny Chesney.
June 30 — Cole Swindell, singer-songwriter of the 2010s.
July 2 — Michelle Branch, member of The Wreckers.
July 12 — Kimberly Perry, lead singer of The Band Perry.
October 3 — Drake White, singer known for his single Livin' the Dream.
November 10 — Miranda Lambert, member of Pistol Annies.
December 12 — Katrina Elam, singer-songwriter of the 2000s.
December 29 — Jessica Andrews, popular teen singer of the late 1990s and early 2000s.

Deaths
April 6 — Cliff Carlisle, 79, country yodeler of the 1930s and steel guitar pioneer.
October 20 — Merle Travis, 65, singer and composer of classic songs such as "Sixteen Tons", "Dark as a Dungeon", "So Round, So Firm, So Fully Packed" and "Smoke, Smoke, Smoke that Cigarette." (heart attack)

Country Music Hall of Fame Inductees
Little Jimmy Dickens (1920–2015)

Major awards

Grammy AwardsBest Female Country Vocal Performance — "A Little Good News", Anne MurrayBest Male Country Vocal Performance — "I.O.U.", – Lee GreenwoodBest Country Performance by a Duo or Group with Vocal — "The Closer You Get", AlabamaBest Country Instrumental Performance — "Fireball", New SouthBest Country Song — "Stranger in My House," Mike Reid (Performer: Ronnie Milsap)

Juno AwardsCountry Male Vocalist of the Year — Eddie EastmanCountry Female Vocalist of the Year — Anne MurrayCountry Group or Duo of the Year — The Good Brothers

Academy of Country MusicEntertainer of the Year — AlabamaSong of the Year — "The Wind Beneath My Wings", Larry Henley and Jeff Silbar (Performer: Gary Morris)Single of the Year — "Islands in the Stream", Kenny Rogers and Dolly PartonAlbum of the Year — The Closer You Get…, AlabamaTop Male Vocalist — Lee GreenwoodTop Female Vocalist — Janie FrickeTop Vocal Duo — Dolly Parton and Kenny RogersTop Vocal Group — AlabamaTop New Male Vocalist — Jim GlaserTop New Female Vocalist — Gus Hardin

Canadian Country Music AssociationEntertainer of the Year — Family BrownMale Artist of the Year — Dick DamronFemale Artist of the Year — Marie BottrellGroup of the Year — Family BrownSOCAN Song of the Year — "Raised on Country Music", Family Brown (Performer: Family Brown)Single of the Year — "Raised on Country Music", Family BrownAlbum of the Year — Raised on Country Music, Family BrownVista Rising Star Award — Kelita HaverlandDuo of the Year — Donna & LeRoy Anderson

Country Music AssociationEntertainer of the Year — AlabamaSong of the Year — "Always on My Mind", Johnny Christopher, Wayne Carson Thompson and Mark James (Performer: Willie Nelson)Single of the Year — "Swingin'", John AndersonAlbum of the Year — The Closer You Get…, AlabamaMale Vocalist of the Year — Lee GreenwoodFemale Vocalist of the Year — Janie FrickeVocal Duo of the Year — Merle Haggard and Willie NelsonVocal Group of the Year — AlabamaHorizon Award — John AndersonInstrumentalist of the Year — Chet AtkinsInstrumental Group of the Year''' — Ricky Skaggs Band

See also
Country Music Association
Inductees of the Country Music Hall of Fame

Further reading
Kingsbury, Paul, "The Grand Ole Opry: History of Country Music. 70 Years of the Songs, the Stars and the Stories," Villard Books, Random House; Opryland USA, 1995
Kingsbury, Paul, "Vinyl Hayride: Country Music Album Covers 1947–1989," Country Music Foundation, 2003
Millard, Bob, "Country Music: 70 Years of America's Favorite Music," HarperCollins, New York, 1993
Whitburn, Joel, "Top Country Songs 1944–2005 – 6th Edition." 2005.

External links
Country Music Hall of Fame
 CMT Founder's Site

Country
Country music by year